The All-Russian Political Party «Right Cause» (PD; ; Vserossiyskaya politicheskaya partiya «Pravoye delo», PD) was an officially registered centre-right Russian political party that existed in 2008–2016, created on the basis of three parties (Civilian Power, the Democratic Party of Russia, the Union of Right Forces), which declared a liberal orientation.

On March 26, 2016 it was renamed into Party of Growth under the chairmanship of Boris Titov. After the reorganization and change of the name by the former chairman of the party Vyacheslav Maratkanov, the public movement "Right Cause" was created.

Formation 

The "Right Cause" party emerged on November 16, 2008 as a result of the unification of three parties that declared a liberal orientation: the Democratic Party of Russia, Civilian Power and the Union of Right Forces, for this self-disbanded. On February 11, 2009 "Just Cause" was officially registered by the Ministry of Justice of the Russian Federation, becoming the only registered political force for the period from 2006 to 2011. The media explained this situation by the fact that the project was approved by the Kremlin.

On November 16, 2008, at the founding congress of Right Cause, 33 people were elected to the first composition of the party's federal political council, including: journalist Georgy Bovt, leader of the Union of Right Forces Leonid Gozman, head of Delovaya Rossiya (Business Russia) Boris Titov, film director Valery Akhadov, lawyer Andrey Dunaev, former deputy of the State Duma Boris Nadezhdin, former Minister of Economy of the Russian Federation Andrey Nechaev, president of the Fund for Legislative Initiatives Grigory Tomchin, Evgeny Chichvarkin was elected chairman of the Moscow branch., e was also made responsible for the branding of the party. Сопредседателями партии стали представители трёх её основательниц: The party was co-chaired by representatives of its three founders: Titov from the Civil Force, Bovt from the DPR, Gozman from the Union of Right Forces, the apparatus was headed by an employee of the Presidential Administration of the Russian Federation, Andrey Dunaev. In the future, there were contradictions between them on the purpose of the party and its relationship with the authorities.

On March 1, 2009, Right Cause took part in the municipal elections for the first time. The party did not manage to complete the registration for the elections, but local candidates of the Right Cause in Tolyatti were able to take part in the elections under the flag of the local public movement December, whose leader was the deputy of the Samara Regional Duma, member of the regional political council of the Just Cause party Sergey Andreev , gaining 26% of the votes (for comparison: "United Russia" – 39%) holding 5 deputies on the list of the movement to the Tolyatti  Duma.

Successful elections 
In 2011, the Right Cause party received 1 mandate in the People's Assembly of the Republic of Dagestan and 1 mandate in the People's Assembly of the Republic of Ingushetia according to the party list

In 2013, the Right Cause party received 1 mandate from the list to the City Duma of Syzran, in the Samara Oblast, and 1 mandate in a single-mandate constituency. and also 2 mandates according to the list in Elektrogorsk, Moscow Oblast 11.18%.

Activities of Mikhail Prokhorov 
On June 26, 2011, billionaire Mikhail Prokhorov (who received an offer to join on April 25, которое он принял 16 мая), which he accepted on May 16) was elected its chairman at the extraordinary congress of Right Cause, the new symbols and image of the party were approved. The new head received the right to single-handedly decide key personnel issues, in particular, to approve the lists of candidates for deputies in the elections, to admit new members to the party, to exclude those who have been fined. The minimum goal was the faction in the State Duma following the elections in December 2011, the maximum goal was to become the "second party of power", and eventually the first. According to The New Times, Prokhorov intended to spend $100 million of personal money on the party's election campaign, and he hoped to take the same amount from his colleagues in the business community.

In July 2011, Prokhorov invited Yevgeny Roizman, the founder of the City Without Drugs Foundation, a deputy of the State Duma of the Russian Federation of the fourth convocation, to the party. Prokhorov suggested that he go to the State Duma elections on the federal party list, so that, if successful, he would be able to engage in the formation of state anti-drug and anti-alcohol policies and legislation. The decision to admit Roizman to the ranks of the federal leadership of the "Right Cause" caused dissatisfaction with the regional branches of the party. The discontent was caused by the fact that Roizman had a conviction for theft, fraud and illegal carrying of knives. The election headquarters of the party, Prokhorov, instructed Rifat Shaykhutdinov, a deputy from the LDPR, to held, in respect of whom the Prosecutor General's Office of the Russian Federation in 2007 submitted a submission to deprive the deputy of immunity for the deliberate bankruptcy of the Main Agency of Air Communications (GUP) and the appropriation of state property. In August 2011, the well-known Russian journalist, author of the TV program Vzglyad Alexander Lyubimov also joined the party.

On August 3, 2011, the Izvestia newspaper published an interview with the head of the Moscow Region branch of the party Boris Nadezhdin, who called for cooperation with nationalists and, in particular, admitted that “officers and young skinheads” are entering the department en masse. Nadezhdin also put forward the slogan "Podmoskovye is the Russian land", after which Mikhail Prokhorov invited Nadezhdin to leave the party if he shares the views of nationalists. Prokhorov wrote in his blog that "if this is his personal conscious position, then he has no place in the party.".

In August 2011, political analyst Alexei Makarkin expressed the opinion that the Right Cause election campaign would be very problematic, since Prokhorov lacks both political experience and experience in party building. Makarkin noted that dissatisfaction with Prokhorov was growing in the regional branches of the party, which the political scientist explained by the fact that “they hoped that a new leader, a billionaire, with big money would come, a golden rain would be shed on them,” but then it turned out that “it would be far from for all".

Confrontation and resignation of Prokhorov 
On June 20, 2011, during the St. Petersburg regional conference (which some of the participants did not recognize as legal), the head of the regional office was changed. Instead of Sergei Tsybukov, Maxim Dolgopolov was elected, previously detained in Dubai on suspicion of the murder of Sulim Yamadayev, but later released. Party leader Mikhail Prokhorov decided to expel all 1,334 members of the St. Petersburg regional branch from the party and at the same time to admit 220 Petersburgers to the party. On August 5, 2011, new members elected Evgeny Mauter, recommended by Prokhorov, as the chairman of the regional branch. Dolgopolov's supporters filed a lawsuit in the Basmanny Court of Moscow.

Even before the congress, scheduled for September 14–15, information appeared in the press about the dissatisfaction of the regional branches of the party with Prokhorov's activities as the party leader. The former head of the Altai "Right Cause" Pavel Chesnov on Tuesday, September 13, told Nezavisimaya Gazeta that the congress could raise the issue of changing the party charter and removing Prokhorov, who could be replaced by Georgy Bovt, Andrey Dunaev or Nikita Belykh.

On September 14, on the first day of the party congress, opponents of Prokhorov received the majority of seats in the credentials committee. At an urgently convened briefing on the evening of September 14, Mikhail Prokhorov announced the termination of the powers of the head of the executive committee, Andrei Dunaev, and the executive committee in full force. Prokhorov also expelled Andrei Bogdanov and the Ryavkin brothers from the party, with the wording "for causing political damage to the party.", and accused the deputy head of the internal policy department of the Presidential Administration of the Russian Federation Radiy Khabirov, who participated in the congress, of an attempt to "raider the party".

On the morning of September 15, Prokhorov on the air of the radio station "Echo of Moscow" called on his supporters to leave the party "Right Cause", and also noted that he intends to create a new party. Mikhail Prokhorov did not announce his withdrawal from the party at the time of the broadcast, but noted that "he is already signing a statement of other members". Opponents of Prokhorov, in turn, announced that at least 65-68 people from 70 regional delegates will be present at the party congress at the World Trade Center (WTC) on Krasnaya Presnya, and the question of Prokhorov's resignation may be raised.

On the morning of September 15, Andrei Dunaev, whom Prokhorov removed from the post of head of the executive committee on September 14, announced at a congress at the WTC: “We have received information through the media that Prokhorov is creating his own party. I propose to vote immediately for the removal of Prokhorov from the post of party leader. " Congress participants supported Dunaev and removed Prokhorov from the post of leader. Andrey Dunaev himself was elected acting head of the party. The reason for the displacement of Prokhorov was the conflict with the regional branches of the "Right Cause", as well as the decision to include Yevgeny Roizman in the electoral list. Prokhorov himself was not present at this congress, but took part in an alternative congress held in parallel at the Russian Academy of Sciences. At the congress, it was announced about "the actual seizure of the party" and about the alleged falsifications in the credentials committee, which, according to Prokhorov, "was planned and carried out by employees of the Presidential Administration, subordinates of Surkov." Prokhorov said that he could no longer be associated with the party, which is "led by puppeteers," and urged his supporters to withdraw from it. Prokhorov declared V. Surkov to be the main culprit of the "raider takeover". Alexander Lyubimov and Alla Pugacheva spoke in support of Prokhorov at the meeting.

On September 15, 2011, Mikhail Prokhorov was dismissed from the post of party chairman by the decision of the party congress chaired by the head of the central office Andrei Dunaev, chairman of the credentials committee Andrei Bogdanov, appointing Andrei Dunaev as acting chairman of the party.

Participation in the 2011 elections. Further political activities 
The program with which the party took part in the 2011 parliamentary election was adopted at the congress on September 20. The party called for the immediate filing of an application by Russia to join the European Union, for "curbing the arbitrariness of officials and security officials" and for the abolition of parliamentary immunity. Right Cause proposed to disband the Federal Protective Service of the Russian Federation so that "officials feel like residents of their country." According to the head of "Right Cause" Andrey Dunaev, "there are too many law enforcement agencies with duplicate functions in the country and, for example, some private agency could protect the top officials of the state.". The party advocated the restoration of universal election of power, including the election of mayors of cities, governors and heads of constituent entities of the Russian Federation and proposed to ban holding elected public office more than twice during a lifetime.

According to one of the leaders of the "Right Cause" and the main author of the program, Vladislav Inozemtsev, the party "stands for the most complete freedom of all citizens' initiatives permitted by law, political, economic, social and cultural." Inozemtsev sees the future of Russia "on the way of overcoming ignorance, dogmatism and obscurantism". Inozemtsev sees the first step on this path as "restoring the secular nature" of the Russian government. According to Inozemtsev, «The time has come to object to the planting of primitive religiosity in a predominantly atheistic country, which has now become a large-scale business project. Priests have no place in schools, the army, or government agencies. Ships and airplanes must sail and fly because they were assembled by skilled and skilled workers, not because they were sprinkled with holy water by the owners of watches costing tens of thousands of dollars. Religion should become a private matter of citizens»

Right Cause also advocated a gradual increase in the retirement age and the legalization of short-barreled weapons.

In 2011, in the parliamentary elections to the State Duma of the 6th convocation, the top three of the Federal list of candidates for "Right Cause" in the elections were headed by Andrey Dunaev, Andrei Bogdanov and tennis player Anna Chakvetadze. Also in the top ten of the electoral list were Vladislav Inozemtsev and Alexander Brod. Boris Nadezhdin, a member of the federal political council of Right Cause, refused to be in the top three of the federal electoral list of the party in the Duma elections, but headed the list of the party in the elections to the Moscow Regional Duma.

On December 4, 2011, at the Elections to the State Duma of the Russian Federation of the 6th convocation, she took the last place, having received 392,507 votes (0.6% of voters) and was unable to get a single representative to the State Duma of Russia.

In 2012, the party supported Vladimir Putin in the presidential elections.

On March 23, 2012, the State Duma adopted amendments to the Federal Law FZ-95 On Political Parties, simplifying the registration of political parties. After that, the former members of the Right Cause left it and established their own. So Mikhail Prokhorov created and registered the Civil Platform, Prokhorov's supporters joined his party. Members Alexander Ryavkin and Vladislav Inozemtsev revived the Civilian PowerCivilian Power party, Andrei Nechaev organized and led his party "Civic Initiative", Andrei Bogdanov revived and led his Democratic Party of Russia.

In August 2012, Ivan Okhlobystin was invited to the party to develop a new ideology. On October 5 this year, due to a resolution of the Holy Synod prohibiting priests from being members of political parties, he left the party, saying that he remained only its spiritual mentor (consultant). On November 3, 2012, Andrei Dunaev said that Right Cause had abandoned its previous course and intends to continue to pursue a right-wing policy with a "national-patriotic bias".

December 18, 2012 Andrei Dunaev left the post of party chairman, his deputy Vyacheslav Maratkanov, who had been deputy chairman for three years before, was appointed acting..

On a single voting day (2013), the party held two of its party deputies in single-mandate constituencies to the City Duma of Syzran. in the city of Tolyatti, it nominated three of its candidates, one of whom was on the party lists the Go-Go dancer Kristina Kazakova, which led to increased and scandalous interest from the local media, however, this did not help the party overcome the electoral barrier.

Electoral results

Presidential elections

Legislative elections

Change of political orientations

National-patriotic bias 
On February 24, 2012, Andrey Dunaev was elected the leader of the Right Cause party, who, after the resignation of Mikhail Prokhorov, served as the party chairman. The leader of the Right to Bear Arms social movement, Maria Butina, spoke at the congress, becoming an ally of the party.

On August 14, 2012, Ivan Okhlobystin was invited to the post of Chairman of the Supreme Council of the Right Cause Party. On August 21, a press conference of the party leadership was held at interfax, at which the Chairman of the Supreme Council Ivan Okhlobystin was represented. Some saw him as a possible future party leader. On October 5 of this year, due to the decision of the Holy Synod prohibiting priests from being members of political parties, he left the party, saying that he remained only its spiritual mentor (consultant).

On November 3, 2012, at the party congress chaired by Andrey Dunaev, the party summed up the failed outcome of the parliamentary elections of the 6th convocation and a decision was made to change political guidelines, abandoning liberal ideology, becoming a right-wing party in all its senses, taking a course towards national patriotism.

On November 6, 2012, the leader of the Right Cause party, Andrei Dunaev, raised the issue of legalizing prostitution in Russia. He said that the party intends to conduct sociological research on this issue and come up with an initiative to parliamentary parties and a possible collection of signatures for legalization. He believes that this will make it possible to officially legalize what already exists, to leave the patronage of criminal and near criminal structures, as well as unscrupulous employees of law enforcement agencies, pay taxes to the state budget, undergo regular medical examinations and claim pension contributions. Andriy Dunaev also added that female sex workers in today's situation have no rights before their employers, equating them with sexual slavery. Currently prostitution is officially legalized in the European EU countries: the Netherlands, Italy, Hungary, Germany. Previously, in 2007, the LDPR came forward with a similar initiative, but the initiative was postponed by the Duma.

Former member of the federal council of Right Cause, and now the leader of the restored Democratic Party of Russia, Andrei Bogdanov spoke out against the initiative of his former colleagues, he also said that he and his party intend to prevent Right Cause from collecting signatures by launching anti-campaign against this initiative.

December 18, 2012 Andrey Dunaev left the post of party chairman, his deputy Vyacheslav Maratkanov was appointed acting.

Party leadership 
On February 29, 2016, at the 7th Congress of the Just Cause party, the business ombudsman Boris Titov was elected chairman of the party, announcing a change in the political course of the party to a "business party" and its rebranding.

Renaming (2016) 
With the return of Boris Titov to the party, a radical reform was carried out, the composition of the political council was changed, the party returned to liberal values and was later renamed the “Party of Growth”.

In January 2016, Boris Titov, at that time the former and head of the industrial committee of the All-Russia People's Front, announced his readiness in the Parliamentary elections in the fall of 2016 to head the list of the party that will defend the interests of medium and small business, after which he held consultations with several parties: "Civilian Power", "Civic Platform", "The Greens", "Rodina" and "Right Cause", choosing the latter. The party itself interested him as a "tool" for participating in elections without collecting signatures (14 parties had this right then) due to the presence of factions in the people's assemblies of Dagestan and Ingushetia. Success, he called overcoming the five percent entry barrier and the formation of a faction in the State Duma of the new convocation.

About 25 regional divisions of the party opposed the coming of Titov, who regarded this as surrender by the leadership "for a raider takeover." Among the new delegates to the congress were former and current members of United Russia, Delovaya Rossiya and the All-Russia People's Front.

On February 29, 2016, Boris Titov was elected chairman of the party at the VII Congress of the Right Cause party, he was supported by 70 delegates in the absence of those who voted against. Managing partner of Management Development Group Dmitry Potapenko, Vice President of Alfa-Bank Vladimir Senin, Internet Ombudsman and member of the General Council of Business Russia Dmitry Marinichev, member of the Civic Chamber and Public Commissioner for the Protection of Small and Medium Business Rights announced their readiness to join the federal council Viktor Ermakov, as well as a member of the Presidium of the General Council of "Business Russia" Mikhail Rosenfeld.

A number of media outlets and political scientists called the arrival of Titov as coordinated with the presidential administration, with which, for example, candidates for the presidium and political council were coordinated. Titov himself admitted that the project of the updated party is connected with the presidential administration, and that he himself is supervised by the first deputy head of the presidential administration of the Russian Federation, Vyacheslav Volodin.

Titov himself stated that his party is going to cooperate with the current government and its supporting forces for changes in the country. Titov himself criticized the leadership of the Central Bank of the Russian Federation and the work of the economic and financial bloc of the government of Dmitry Medvedev (while he simultaneously criticized and defended the Platon system introduced by the federal authorities), while supporting foreign policy, in particular, the annexation of Crimea in 2014.

A group of deputies who left A Just Russia (Oksana Dmitriyeva, her husband Ivan Grachev, and Natalya Petukhova) and two deputies of United Russia - Elena Nikolaeva and Viktor Zvagelsky, a former State Duma deputy, leader of the "Movement of Motorists of Russia" Viktor Pokhmelkin, announced their readiness to cooperate with the party. However, they did not join the party, intending to participate in the elections on party lists. Subsequently, Boris Titov and his deputy Tatyana Marchenko announced that they were joining the general council of Right Cause entrepreneurs (apart from Oleg Deripaska named by them, Vedomosti newspaper mentioned the former shareholder of Wimm-Bill-Dann, David Yakobashvili, the former owner of Svyaznoy, Maxim Nogotkov, co-owner “Geoteka” by Nikolay Levitsky, President of “Rostik Group” Rostislav Ordovsky-Tanaevsky Blanco and son of Boris Titov,  Chairman of the Board of Directors of “Abrau-Durso” Pavel Titov). Later, a number of the mentioned persons, together with Deripaska, denied participation in the political project.

At the party congress on March 26, its name was changed to "Party of Growth" due to negative associations with the former name. The party's program was the document "The Economy of Growth", created by Boris Titov together with the adviser to the President of the Russian Federation Vladimir Putin, Sergey Glazyev. It proposes "to reduce the key rate to 5.5%", "to start monetizing the economy and at least double the money supply", to make the court independent of the government. The party leadership called the CPRF, Yabloko, Civic Platform and PARNAS as their competitors.

Party central apparatus 
From 2008 to 2011, the Central Office of Right Cause was located in Moscow, in the building of the Civil Power party (which became one of the founders) at 16, Myasnitskaya Street. From 2011 to 2013, the central office was located in the former central headquarters of the Nashi movement at the address: Veskovsky lane, 2, since 2013, the central office of the Right Cause was located at Bolshoi Zlatoustinsky lane, house 6. Since August 2014, the central office of the party moved to address st. Vozdvizhenka 7/6 building 1.

Party leadership 
 Boris Titov (Chairman February 29–March 26, 2016)
 Vyacheslav Maratkanov (Acting Chairman 2012–2016)
 Andrey Dunaev (Chairman 2011–2012)
 Mikhail Prokhorov (Chairman June–September 2011)
 Leonid Gozman (Co-Chairman 2008–2011)
 Georgy Bovt (Co-Chairman 2008–2011)
 Boris Titov (Co-Chairman 2008–2011)

Ideology 

 Liberal conservatism
 National democracy (November 2012 – February 2016)

Party incomes and expenses 
In 2009, the party existed on donations: 22.2% of income was provided by donations from individuals, 74.8% of income: transfers from legal entities. In 2015, the party's income was insignificant: 89.3 thousand rubles.

Alexander Lyubimov's opinion on the results of the party's activities 
We wanted to go to the Duma elections with the Right Cause party, but nothing came of it. It is obvious to me that it is still impossible to engage in full-fledged political activity in Russia. It is necessary either to join the united ranks of the members of the party of the power, or to be ready to splash zelyonka in the face. As they say, thank you for not acid. This option does not suit me. It's not very comfortable to work when you constantly have to think about your own safety and wait for someone to come up from behind with Bad Intentions.

References

External links
Общественное движение Правое дело
Официальный сайт «Партии Роста»
«Почему миллионер Константин Бабкин и его "Партия дела" не пошли с миллиардером Михаилом Прохоровым в "Правое дело"»: Интервью Михаила Соколова с Константином Бабкиным на Радио "Свобода", 06.09.2011
Правое дело — статья в Лентапедии. 2012 год.

2008 establishments in Russia
2016 disestablishments in Russia
Conservative liberal parties
Defunct conservative parties
Defunct liberal political parties
Defunct political parties in Russia
Formerly registered political parties in Russia
Liberal conservative parties
Political parties disestablished in 2016
Political parties established in 2008
Pro-European political parties in Russia